Scopula agrapta is a moth of the family Geometridae. It was described by Warren in 1902. It is found in Kenya, South Africa, Tanzania and Uganda.

References

Moths described in 1902
agrapta
Moths of Africa
Taxa named by William Warren (entomologist)